Christian views on environmentalism vary among different Christians and Christian denominations.

Major Christian denominations endorse the Biblical calling of our stewardship of God's creation and our responsibility for its care. Some of this church policy is relatively recent and may not be followed by some parishioners. According to some social science research, conservative Christians and members of the Christian right are typically less concerned about issues of environmentalism than the general public and some fundamentalist Christians deny global warming and climate change.
 Many Christians are environmental activists who promote awareness and action at the church, community, and national levels.

Green Christianity is a broad field that encompasses Christian theological reflection on nature, Christian liturgical and spiritual practices centered on environmental issues, as well as Christian-based activism in the environmental movement. Within the activism arena, green Christianity refers to a diverse group of Christians who emphasize the biblical or theological basis for protecting and celebrating the environment. The term indicates not a particular denomination, but a shared territory of concern.

Status of nature in Christianity has been hotly debated, especially since historian Lynn White published the now classic The historical roots of present-day ecologic crisis in 1967 in which he blames Christianity for the modern environmental crisis which he concludes is largely due to the dominance of Christian world-view in the west which is exploitative of nature in unsustainable manner. He asserts that Judeo-Christian are anti-ecological, hostile towards nature, imposed a break between human and nature with attitude to exploit the nature in unsustainable way where people stopped thinking of themselves as part of the nature. This exploitative attitude combined with the new technology and industrial revolution wreaked havoc on the ecology, the colonial forestry is a prime example of this destruction of ecology and native faiths. Lynn White's argument made in a 1966 lecture before the American Academy of Arts and Sciences, subsequently published in the journal Science, that Western Christianity, having de-sacralized and instrumentalized nature to human ends, bears a substantial "burden of guilt" for the contemporary environmental crisis. White's essay stimulated a flurry of responses, ranging from defenses of Christianity to qualified admissions to complete agreement with his analysis.

Basic beliefs
Christianity has a long historical tradition of reflection on nature and human responsibility. Christianity has a strong tendency toward anthropocentrism, as emphasized in the early environmentalist critique of Lynn Townsend White, Jr. While some Christians favor a more biocentric approach, Catholic officials and others seek to retain an emphasis on humanity while incorporating environmental concerns within a framework of Creation Care. Christian environmentalists emphasize the ecological responsibilities of all Christians as stewards of God's earth.

Beginning with the verse Genesis 1:26–28, God instructs humanity to manage the creation in particular ways.

Adam's early purpose was to give care to the Garden of Eden:

Green Christians point out that the biblical emphasis is on stewardship, not ownership—that the earth remains the Lord's (Psalms 24:1) and does not belong to its human inhabitants. Leviticus 25:23 states:

As a result of the doctrine of stewardship, Christian environmentalists oppose policies and practices that threaten the health or survival of the planet. Of particular concern to such Christians are the current widespread reliance on non-renewable resources, habitat destruction, pollution, and all other factors that contribute to climate change or otherwise threaten the health of the ecosystem. Many Christian environmentalists have broken with conservative political leaders as a result of these positions.

Anglican – Episcopal Church
The Anglican Communion and the Episcopal Church have strong beliefs about the need for environmental awareness and actions.  Reducing carbon footprints and moving toward sustainable living are priorities. The British have played a leading role in the modern environmentalist movement and Prince Philip, Duke of Edinburgh in 1995 created an NGO, known as the Alliance of Religions and Conservation, to change the views of religions on environmentalism and global warming. It was headed up by an Anglican, the Secretary General, Martin Palmer, for many years.

Orthodox Churches

Eastern Orthodox

Patriarch Bartholomew I of Constantinople, the "first among equals" in the Eastern Orthodox Communion, has voiced support for aspects of the environmentalist movement, as has Pope John Paul II of Rome. Fr. John Chryssavgis serves as advisor to the Ecumenical Patriarch, currently Bartholomew I, on environmental issues such as global warming. Orthodox Christian theology is generally more mystical and panentheistic than the traditions which developed in the Christian West, emphasizing the renewal and transfiguration of the whole creation through Christ's redemptive work. Many Eastern Christian monastics are known for having cultivated unusually close relationships with wild animals.

Non-Chalcedonian, or Oriental Orthodox

Armenian Apostolic Church

In the nineteenth century, Catholicos Nerses V of All Armenians planted a forest stretching 100 hectares. Much of it was destroyed during the Communist era but replanting efforts have begun in the twenty-first century.

The late Catholicos Karekin I stated that the Armenian Apostolic Church is committed to the defence of creation because harming the gift of God is a sin when man has a duty to care for it.

Under Catholicos Karekin II, the Armenian Church produced a seven-year ecological action plan.

Ethiopian Orthodox 'Tewahedo' Church

Traditionally, Ethiopian Orthodox monasteries and some churches have preserved small sacred forests around their buildings in memory of the Garden of Eden. This has allowed many endangered species to survive in areas where their habitat has otherwise been lost.

Evangelical churches

As the scientific community has presented evidence of climate change, some members of the evangelical community and other Christian groups have emphasized the need for Christian ecology, often employing the phrase "creation care" to indicate the religious basis of their project. Some of these groups are now interdenominational, having begun from an evangelical background and then gained international and interdenominational prominence with the increase in public awareness of environmental issues. Organizations with an evangelical genesis include A Rocha, the Evangelical Climate Initiative and the Evangelical Environmental Network.

Some prominent members of the so-called Christian right have broken with the Bush administration and other conservative politicians over the issue of climate change. Christianity Today endorsed the McCain-Lieberman Bill, which was eventually defeated by the Republican Congress and opposed by Bush. According to the magazine, "Christians should make it clear to governments and businesses that we are willing to adapt our lifestyles and support steps towards changes that protect our environment." The increasing Christian support for strong positions on climate change and related issues has been referred to as "The Greening of Evangelicals." Many Christians have expressed dissatisfaction with a leadership they feel places the interests of big businesses over Christian doctrine.

Many conservative evangelical Christians have embraced climate change denialism or maintain a neutral stance due to the lack of internal consensus on such issues. The Cornwall Alliance is an organization which takes an opposing view on the issue to the Evangelical Climate Initiative. The National Association of Evangelicals has stated that "global warming is not a consensus issue", and is internally divided on the Christian response to climate change.

Latter Day Saints, The Church of Jesus Christ of Latter-Day Saints 

The Latter Day Saint movement has a complex relationship with environmental concerns, involving not only the religion but politics and economics. Mormon environmentalists find theological reasons for stewardship and conservationism through biblical and additional scriptural references including a passage from the Doctrine and Covenants: "And it pleaseth God that he hath given all these things unto man; for unto this end were they made to be used, with judgment, not to excess, neither by extortion". In terms of environmentally friendly policies, The Church of Jesus Christ of Latter-day Saints (LDS Church) has some history of conservationist policies for their meetinghouses and other buildings. The church first placed solar panels on a church meetinghouse in the Tuamotu Islands in 2007. In 2010, the church unveiled five LEED certified meetinghouse prototypes that are being used for future meetinghouse designs around the world, the first one having been completed in 2010 in Farmington, Utah.

Lutheran
Major Lutheran Synods acknowledge that the Bible calls us to care for God's creation.  The dominion that God gave His human creatures has often been abused, carried out to the detriment of creation:  loss of biodiversity, resource depletion, environmental damage, etc.   We are called to live according to God's wisdom in Creation with his other creatures. Sustainable living is needed.

Presbyterian Churches 
Environmental stewardship remains a deep commitment for many Presbyterians. A significant number of mid-twentieth century progressive conservationists were Presbyterian or raised in the Presbyterian faith.

Two of many such men and women of nature were John Muir and William Keith. Both Muir, the noted father of national parks, and Keith, a landscape artist, were raised in staunch Calvinist Presbyterian homes in Scotland during the nineteenth century. Besides his establishment of the Sierra Club, Muir particularly had a passion for the study of natural theology. Keith, in contrast, expressed his devotion to God through painting. Muir highly appreciated Keith's work and praised it as “a kind of inspired bible of the mountain.” Another early Presbyterian conservationist supporter was Carleton Watkins, a New York photographer responsible for many of Yosemite's many iconic images, which helped build public support in the days of the national park's founding. Their Reformed spiritual upbringing informed their ideas about nature that humanity's role was as God's keeper of the land.

Calvinist theology, which emphasizes God's sovereignty over creation, inspired such environmentalists to see God's glory in nature. Seeing that Calvinists like Presbyterians believe in God's sustaining power, they consider that the Divine intimately relates to the created order through providence. In his Institutes of the Christian Religion, John Calvin further taught that nature acted as the most apparent medium of God's revelation outside of Sacred Scripture. The Westminster Confession of Faith echoes this teaching in the first chapter on Holy Scripture and the fourth on creation.

Presbyterian Church (U.S.A) 
The mainline Presbyterian Church (U.S.A) has been an outspoken supporter of modern environmental causes. In 2018, the 223rd General Assembly approved a new policy of combating environmental racism. Other initiatives include establishing Presbyterian Earth Care Congregations and Green Leaf Seal camps, which involve many member churches and conference centers across the United States.

The church's 2010 “Earth Care Pledge” summarizes some of the critical aspects of creation restoration. The pledge is divided into four parts or resolutions. First, worship and discipleship are said to be the foundation on which the faithful ground their desire for earth protection. Second, through education, the flock may better understand the threats to God's creation and the harms which it suffers. Thirdly, church facilities will be fitted with energy-efficient resources. Lastly, outreach with local communities is a positive means to achieve environmental justice.

Furthermore, denominational resources on earth care for local congregations stay widely available for distribution.

Quakerism 
The Religious Society of Friends, or Quakers, have a rich history of environmental concern. Inspired by the testimony of stewardship, Friends have sought to practice ethical economics and creation care since the earliest days of the Society's founding.

Quakers have continued to express environmental concerns to this day. Numerous organizations and initiatives unite Quakers in the cause of environmental sustainability.

Founded in 1987 as the Friends Committee on Unity with Nature and later named Quaker Earthcare Witness, the organization remains an active participant in calling attention to the current ecological crises. Based on Quaker convictions, the organization argues that the deeper cause of environmental problems has resulted from a more profound spiritual crisis of human separation from the land.

The Earth Quaker Action Team is a non-violent protest organization that engages in the fight for ecojustice. Numerous news stories have highlighted the groups’ demonstrations. Energy companies which they view as ecologically harmful are often the targets of opposition. For example, in 2016, the Quaker activist group pressured the Philadelphia-based power company, PECO, to utilize solar. Another notable protest was in 2010: Bank Like Appalachia Matters, or (BLAM!), which called for the PNC Bank to end financing industries engaged in mountaintop coal mining. By 2015, the EQAT was successful with its demands, and the bank ceased financing such enterprises.

Roman Catholic Church

Catholic environmental activists have found support in teachings by Pope Paul VI (Octogesima adveniens, #21) and Pope John Paul II (e.g., the encyclical Centesimus annus, #37–38).

Pope Francis has published an encyclical, named "Laudato si' (Be Praised), On the Care of Our Common Home", which aims to inspire everyone – not just Roman Catholics – to protect the Earth.
He endorses climate action and has made cases on Christian environmentalism on several occasions. 
"Take good care of creation. St. Francis wanted that. People occasionally forgive, but nature never does. If we don’t take care of the environment, there’s no way of getting around it."

Seventh-day Adventists

The Seventh-day Adventist church is committed to environmental stewardship as well as taking action to avoid the dangers of climate change.

According to its official statement, the church "advocates a simple, wholesome lifestyle, where people do not step on the treadmill of unbridled over-consumption, accumulation of goods, and production of waste. A reformation of lifestyle is called for, based on respect for nature, restraint in the use of the world's resources, reevaluation of one's needs, and reaffirmation of the dignity of created life."

In 2010, Loma Linda University, one of the church's largest universities, introduced the Loma Linda University Center for Biodiversity and Conservation Studies. The goal of the center is to address the comparative lack of environmental concern among Christians by increasing awareness of environmental issues. The center features animal displays representing global biodiversity hotspots of special concern and also introduces visitors to original scientific research being conducted in the school's biology, geology and natural sciences departments.

Southern Baptist

The Southern Baptist Environment and Climate Initiative is an independent coalition of Southern Baptist pastors, leaders, and laypersons who believe in stewardship that is both biblically rooted and intellectually informed.

United Methodist Church
The United Methodist Church believes in the need for environmental stewardship.  For Christians, the idea of sustainability flows directly from the biblical call to human beings to be stewards of God's creation.

See also

 Catholic Earthcare Australia
 Christian vegetarianism
 Cornwall Alliance
 Ecojesuit
 Environmental policy
 Environmental protection
 Environmental vegetarianism
 Evangelical Climate Initiative
 Evangelical environmentalism
 The Green Bible
 Pollution and the Death of Man
 Presbyterian Church (USA) Carbon Neutral Resolution
 Ecotheology
 Restoring Eden

References

Further reading
 Allen, R. S., E. Castano, and P. D. Allen. (2007) Conservatism and concern for the environment. Quarterly Journal of Ideology 30(3/4):1-25.

 Elizabeth Breuilly (Author) with editor Martin Palmer. (1992) Christianity and Ecology 
 Ialenti, Vincent & Meridian 180. "Toward a Global Intellectual Response to Pope Francis' Environmental Thought." Religious Left Law. 1/18/2016.
 Konisky, D. M., J. Milyo, and L. E. Richardson, Jr. (2008) Environmental policy attitudes: issues, geographic scale, and political trust. Social Science Quarterly 89:1066–1085.
 Frederick Krueger, American editor. (2012) Greening the Orthodox Parish: A Handbook for Christian Ecological Practice   
 Guth, J. L., J. C. Green, L. A. Kellstedt, and C. E. Smidt. (1995) Faith and the environment: religious beliefs and attitudes on environmental policy. American Journal of Political Science 39:364–382.
 McCright, A. M., and R. E. Dunlap. (2003) Defeating Kyoto: the conservative movement's impact on U.S. climate change policy. Social Problems 50:348–373.
 Merritt, Jonathan.  (2010) Green Like God: Unlocking the Divine Plan for Our Planet 
 Schultz, P. W., L. Zelezny, and N. J. Dalrymple. (2000) A multinational perspective on the relation between Judeo-Christian religious beliefs and attitudes of environmental concern. Environment and Behavior 32:576–591.
Wilkinson, Katharine K. (2012) Between God & Green Oxford University Press

External links
 Creation Care Reading Room, Tyndale Seminary resources for Christian environmental ethics 
 Various resources relating to Christianity and the environment
 A Rocha – An international Christian nature conservation organization
 Christian Environmental Association
 Care of Creation Inc., an evangelical environmental organization
 Religion and Foreign Policy Initiative, Council on Foreign Relations, http://cfr.org/religion.
 "Conservative Evangelicals embrace God and green: Why some right-leaning evangelical Christians have become true believers in climate change. God and green go together, these conservatives say"
 Islam, Christianity and the Environment
 Climate For Change: What the church can do about global warming by Elizabeth Groppe America 26 March 2012
 Radio Interview with Dr. Heather Eaton on the issue of Christianity, Ecological Literacy and the Environmental Crisis, University of Toronto, 13 July 2007.
 Global Heat Wave 10 September 2012 issue commentary by the Editors America published by Jesuits
 The Catholic Climate Covenant
 Evangelical Leaders Urge Action on Climate Change on NPR
 Prince Charles discusses environment with the Pope, Associated Press, 27 April 2009.
 Creationism.org – Christian Stewardship of the Environment

 
Environmental ethics